The Hotel Mariador Palace is a hotel in Conakry, Guinea. It is situated in the Quartier de Ratoma area of the city. The hotel was built in 1999, using investment from the Far East.
It is the third of a chain started by Guinean entrepreneur Mohamed Lamine Sylla in 1987.

Location and facilities

The Mariador Palace is a four-storey luxury hotel in Ratoma, Conakry, with 96 Rooms. 
It is in a residential part of Conakry, about 15 minutes by road from Conakry International Airport to the east. 
It situated beside the sea, and has a large terrace with a swimming pool and a covered area with an impressive thatched roof. 
There is an International restaurant, and a shopping arcade. The air conditioned rooms have balconies overlooking the sea.
The hotel is decorated with local artisans' products.

See also
List of buildings and structures in Guinea

References

Buildings and structures in Conakry
Hotels in Guinea
Hotel buildings completed in 1999
Hotels established in 1999
1999 establishments in Guinea